Sister Mary-Joy Langdon BEM (born 1951) is a British nun who was the first woman to be an operational firefighter in Britain on 21 August 1976. She started a pony riding centre to supply therapy and she was an Olympic flag carrier in 2012.

Life and career 
Langdon was born in 1951 in Battle, East Sussex. She attended Charters Towers School, Bexhill, East Sussex.

In the summer of 1976 there was a major drought in Britain and the fire brigades needed extra people. Langdon volunteered and joined the Battle fire station, close to her family farm as part of the East Sussex Fire Brigade part-time but being on call for 24 hours. She had passed all the normal tests including carrying an  man for 100 yards. At the age 25, she was the UK's first ever female firefighter to be formally admitted to a brigade.  She joined on 21 August 1976., leaving in 1983. In 1978 women firefighters were accepted everywhere in the UK.

In 1984 Sister Mary-Joy joined the Roman Catholic congregation Sisters of the Infant Jesus.

Wormwood Scrubs Pony Centre 
Sister Mary-Joy founded the Wormwood Scrubs Pony Centre, a charity, in 1989. The Centre is an inner city community riding school for children and young people, many of whom have learning difficulties and physical disabilities. The children, parents and local people are encouraged to actively get involved by offering help with fund raising or joining the volunteering programmes. In 1994 the TV program "Challenge Annekabuilt a training ground for the charity. The actor Martin Clunes and the painter Lucian Freud have been supporters. When Freud first visited Langdon helpfully gave him a book on how to paint horses.

In 2012 she was chosen to be one of the people carrying the Olympic torch on its journey to the 2012 Summer Olympics in London.

See also
Women in firefighting

References

External links
 Wormwood Scrubs Pony Centre

1951 births
Living people
Women in firefighting
British firefighters
20th-century English Roman Catholic nuns
21st-century English Roman Catholic nuns